The 2020–21 Division 1 Féminine season, also known as D1 Arkema for sponsorship reasons, was the 47th edition of Division 1 Féminine since its establishment in 1974. The season began on 5 September 2020 and ended on 5 June 2021. Lyon were the defending champions, having won the title for last fourteen consecutive seasons. Paris Saint-Germain won their first league title in history after securing a 3–0 win against Dijon on the final day of the season.

Teams

A total of 12 teams compete in the league. Champions and runners-up of previous season's Division 2 Féminine (Issy and Le Havre) replaced two relegated teams from last season's Division 1 Féminine (Metz and Marseille).

League table

Results

Positions by round
The table lists the positions of teams after each week of matches. In order to preserve chronological evolvements, any postponed matches are not included to the round at which they were originally scheduled, but added to the full round they were played immediately afterwards.

Season statistics

Top scorers
As of 5 June 2021

Top assists
As of 5 June 2021

Most clean sheets
As of 5 June 2021

Hat-tricks

4 Player scored four goals.
7 Player scored seven goals.

Awards

Player of the Month

UNFP Awards

Nominations for Player of the Year, Young Player of the Year and Goalkeeper of the Year were announced on 11 May 2021. Winners along with Team of the Year were announced on 21, 22 and 23 May.

Note: Winners are displayed in boldface.

Player of the Year

Young Player of the Year

Goalkeeper of the Year

Team of the Year

FFF D1 Arkema Awards
Nominations for Goal of the Season were announced on 26 May 2021. Nominations for Best Player, Best Young Player, Best Manager and Best Goalkeeper were announced on 1 June. Winners along with Team of the Season were published in FFF's official website on 5 June.

Note: Winners are displayed in boldface.

Best Player

Best Young Player

Best Goalkeeper

Best Manager

Goal of the Season

Team of the Season

References

External links
  Official website
   FootoFéminin

Division 1 Féminine seasons
2020–21 domestic women's association football leagues
Division 1 Féminine